Les Affaires is a French-language monthly business-oriented newspaper publishing 14 issues per year. Founded in 1928, it is now owned by the Contex Group since 2019. Its headquarters is in Montreal. It is directed by Pierre Marcoux (President, Contex Group) and Marine Thomas (Chief editor).

Les Affaires is aimed at those who do or are interested in Quebec business through business journalism, original platforms to facilitate business development, and content relating to business management and personal finance.

The content features and relevant articles on management, business strategy and entrepreneurship. The newspaper aims to look beyond the facts in examining issues of topical interest.

The intended audience is business people and individuals age 30 to 55.

Les Affaires is available in print and digital editions through its App. The content of the newspaper as well as additional material is available online at lesaffaires.com, which is designed for compatibility with multiple platforms (mobile, tablets, computers, TVs).  There is also a Facebook page, a Twitter account, an Instagram account and a LinkedIn company page. Les Affaires also has a division that organizes major events for the business community and a personal finance magazine Les Affaires Plus.

See also
List of newspapers in Canada
List of Quebec media
Claude Beauchamp

References

External links
 Les Affaires

1928 establishments in Quebec
Business newspapers published in Canada
French-language newspapers published in Quebec
Newspapers published in Montreal
Publications established in 1928
Transcontinental Media publications
Weekly newspapers published in Quebec